The Conklin House, the Johnson House, and the Kee House in Chandler, Oklahoma are 
Colonial Revival houses from the pre-statehood era of Oklahoma that are recognized as significant by the "Territorial Homes in Chandler" MPS.

Conklin House

The Conklin House in Chandler, Oklahoma is a Colonial Revival house that was built in 1905.  It was listed on the National Register of Historic Places in 1984 as part of multiple property submission for "Territorial Homes of Chandler".

It is a 2.5-story house with a large two-story balconied portico with pedimented roof, and a veranda supported by Tuscan order columns.  One of the oldest houses in Conklin, it was regarded to be the "most impressive" in Chandler before Oklahoma's statehood and in early statehood years.  It was built for E.L. Conklin, a leader in Chandler active in the Union National Bank of Chandler who also served as agent to the Sac and Fox Indians.

Johnson House

The Johnson House is a two-story white clapboard house, also with a pedimented two-tier portico.  The columns supporting the pediment are Ionic order.  It also has a veranda around two sides of the house, supported by five single-story Tuscan order columns.

Kee House
The Kee House was built in 1898.  It has a two-story balconied porch and stained glass windows.  It has polychromatic walls, including red brick on the first floor level and fish scale pattern wood shingles on the second.  It was originally the home of United States Marshall Kee, then William Tilghman, and later A.E. Patrick, J.W. Adams, and P.D. Erwin.

References

Houses on the National Register of Historic Places in Oklahoma
Colonial Revival architecture in Oklahoma
Houses completed in 1905
Houses in Lincoln County, Oklahoma
National Register of Historic Places in Lincoln County, Oklahoma
Houses completed in 1897
1905 establishments in Oklahoma Territory
1897 establishments in Indian Territory
Chandler, Oklahoma